Martinich is a surname. Bearers include:
Aloysius Martinich (born 1946), US philosopher
Art Martinich, former US soccer player who earned caps in 1973
Ivania Martinich (born 1995), Chilean tennis player
Marcos Martinich (born 1996), Argentine professional footballer

See also
Martinić, a likely related Croatian surname
Martinovich
Martinic (disambiguation)